Walter Kogler (born 12 December 1967) is a retired Austrian football player.

Club career
A central defender, Kogler started his professional career at SK Sturm Graz and also played for clubs such as FK Austria Wien, SV Austria Salzburg, LASK Linz and FC Tirol Innsbruck. He had a short spell abroad, playing 11 games in the French League for AS Cannes.

International career
He made his debut for Austria in a September 1991 friendly match against Portugal, in which he immediately scored a goal. He also was a participant at the 1998 FIFA World Cup. He earned 28 caps, scoring once. His last international was a September 2001 World Cup qualification match against Bosnia and Herzegovina.

Honours
Austrian Football Bundesliga:
1993, 1997, 2000, 2001, 2002
Austrian Cup:
1994

References

External links
Profile - Austria Archive

1967 births
Living people
People from Wolfsberg
Austrian footballers
Austria international footballers
1998 FIFA World Cup players
SK Sturm Graz players
FK Austria Wien players
FC Red Bull Salzburg players
AS Cannes players
LASK players
FC Wacker Innsbruck (2002) managers
FC Kärnten players
Austrian Football Bundesliga players
Ligue 1 players
Austrian expatriate footballers
Expatriate footballers in France
Austrian football managers
Expatriate football managers in Germany
DSV Leoben managers
Association football defenders
3. Liga managers
Footballers from Carinthia (state)
Australian expatriate sportspeople in France
Australian expatriate sportspeople in Germany
FC Tirol Innsbruck players